HMS Malcolm could refer to any of the following Royal Navy ships:
 HMS Malcolm was the original name for the Admiralty V-class destroyer leader , launched in 1917 and broken up in 1936
  was an Admiralty type flotilla leader, commissioned in 1919 and decommissioned in 1945

Royal Navy ship names